Katherine Sebov (born January 5, 1999) is a Canadian professional tennis player. She reached a career-high WTA singles ranking of No. 190, on 16 January 2023, and a career-high ITF junior ranking of No. 22, on 20 July 2015.

Early life
Sebov was born in Toronto and is of Ukrainian descent. Her coaches are Simon Bartram in Toronto and Robert Lansdorp in Los Angeles.

Tennis career

2013–14
Sebov made her professional debut in November 2013 at a $50k event in Toronto, but was defeated in the qualifying second round in singles and in the first round in doubles. In July 2013, she had won her first junior singles title at the G4 in Vancouver. In July 2014 at Wimbledon, she qualified for her junior Grand Slam main-draw debut where she lost in the first round in singles and in the quarterfinals in the doubles. In September 2014, Sebov advanced to the third round in singles as a qualifier at the junior US Open and was defeated in the first round in doubles.

2015
In January, Sebov won her second singles junior title, this time at the G1 in Traralgon. A week later, she reached the second round in singles and the quarterfinals in doubles at the junior event of the Australian Open. In March, she qualified for the $25k main draw in Rancho Santa Fe, but fell in the first round to CiCi Bellis. Sebov made it to the second round in singles and to the first round in doubles at the junior French Open in May. In June at the junior competition of Wimbledon, she was eliminated in the first round in singles and in the second round in doubles. In July, she qualified for the main draw of the $50k event in Granby, defeating, respectively, compatriot Catherine Leduc (world No. 155), Julia Glushko, and fellow Canadian Petra Januskova. She was eliminated by Amandine Hesse (No. 224) in the opening round. At the US Open junior tournament, she fell in the first round in singles.

2016
At the Australian Open, Sebov advanced to the third round of the junior event in singles but was defeated in the first round in doubles. She decided to focus on the pro circuit for the rest of the season and did not play any other junior tournaments. In May, she reached back-to-back semifinals at $10ks in Antalya. In October, she qualified at the $50k in Saguenay where she was defeated by Sachia Vickery in the second round. Two weeks later in Toronto, she qualified for her second straight $50k main draw, but was once again stopped in the second round, by eventual winner CiCi Bellis.

2017
In January, Sebov qualified and reached the semifinals of the $25k tournament in Orlando. Two weeks later, she qualified for the $100k event in Midland and defeated world No. 121, Verónica Cepede Royg, in the opening round. She next played Sofya Zhuk and defeated her in straight sets. In the quarterfinals, Sebov scored the biggest win of her career so far with a victory over world No. 97, Varvara Lepchenko, her first top-100 win. She lost to world No. 98, Naomi Broady, in the next round. Sebov was selected to represent Canada at the Fed Cup Americas Zone Group I in early February, along with Bianca Andreescu, Charlotte Robillard-Millette and Carol Zhao, and made her debut with wins over María Fernanda Álvarez Terán of Bolivia, Montserrat González of Paraguay and Bárbara Gatica of Chile. She ended the ties with a 4–0 overall record and helped Canada reach the World Group II Play-offs. In late February, at the $25k in Rancho Santa Fe, she advanced to the semifinals where she lost to the first seed Kayla Day. In July, she reached her first professional final at the $60k Challenger de Granby but was defeated by Cristiana Ferrando.

2018
In March at a $25k tournament in Toyota, Sebov reached her second final, losing to Dejana Radanović in three sets.

2023: Grand Slam debut
She made her major debut at the 2023 Australian Open.

Performance timelines

Singles

ITF Circuit finals

Singles: 9 (3 titles, 6 runner-ups)

Doubles: 1 (title)

Head-to-head record

Record against top 100 players
Sebov's win–loss record (1–3, 25%) against players who were ranked world No. 100 or higher when played is as follows:
  Varvara Lepchenko 1–0
  Ashleigh Barty 0–1
  Irina-Camelia Begu 0–1
  Naomi Broady 0–1
 *statistics as of 11 February 2018

References

External links
 
 
 

1999 births
Living people
Canadian female tennis players
Canadian people of Ukrainian descent
Tennis players from Toronto